Josh Grisetti (born December 1, 1981) is an American actor, director and author who works in theatre, television and film.

Early life 
Grisetti was born in Washington, D.C. and grew up outside of Roanoke, Virginia. He attended high school at the North Carolina School of the Arts to graduate in 2000 with a diploma in Drama. He attended college at The Boston Conservatory where he graduated in 2004 with a Bachelor of Fine Arts in Musical Theatre.

Career

Broadway and Off-Broadway 
Grisetti starred in the York Theatre's 2008-2009 musical adaption of Enter Laughing (originally titled So Long, 174th Street), garnering a Theatre World Award for "Outstanding Debut Performance" as well as Drama Desk, Outer Critics Circle, Lucille Lortel and Drama League Award nominations. Grisetti was supposed to have made his Broadway debut in the 2009–2010 season, starring as "Eugene Morris Jerome" in the Neil Simon revival of Broadway Bound, directed by David Cromer. Because of poor ticket sales, Broadway Bound'''s sister show (Brighton Beach Memoirs) closed just days after opening at the Nederlander Theatre, canceling Broadway Bound two weeks before its scheduled premiere.

Grisetti's actual Broadway debut took place in the original musical It Shoulda Been You in 2015, playing the role of Marty Kaufman.  He received nominations from the Drama Desk Awards and the Outer Critics Circle for his performance, and won one of two 2015 Clarence Derwent Awards. He returned to Broadway in 2016 to replace John Cariani as Nigel Bottom in "Something Rotten!"

 Television and film 
In 2007, Grisetti starred in the short-lived ABC sitcom The Knights of Prosperity. On film, he has appeared in The Immigrant (2013 film), The Namesake (2007 film), and others. He also starred in two pilots for NBC, The Gates (2013) and Like Magic (2019), that were not ordered to series. IMDb.com, Josh Grisetti filmography.

 Publishing 
In February 2016, under his full name of Joshua Steven Grisetti, he published a memoir entitled God in my Head: the true story of an ex-Christian who accidentally met God. In this memoir, Grisetti claims he overdosed on pain medications while at his dentist's office and experienced a Near Death Experience in which God essentially explained to him the secrets of the Universe.  These 'secrets' are New Age in orientation, similar to the writings of Eckhart Tolle (A New Earth) and William Young (The Shack). The book was originally self-published, but subsequently purchased by Tantor Media and republished as an audiobook.

 Awards and nominations 

 Awards 

 2015 Clarence Derwent Awards for "Most Promising Male Actor" - It Shoulda Been You 2011 Garland Award for "Performance in a Musical" - How to Succeed in Business Without Really Trying 2010 Los Angeles Ovation Award for "Lead Actor in a Musical" - How to Succeed in Business Without Really Trying 2009 Theatre World Award for "Outstanding Broadway/Off-Broadway Debut" - Enter Laughing The Musical Nominations 
 2020 Los Angeles Ovation Award for "Featured Actor in a Musical" - Beauty and the Beast (musical) 2015 Drama Desk Award for "Outstanding Featured Actor in a Musical" - It Shoulda Been You 2015 Outer Critics Circle Award for "Outstanding Featured Actor in a Musical" - It Shoulda Been You 2012 Clive Barnes Award "Theatre Finalist" - Enter Laughing:The Musical 2009 Lucille Lortel Award for "Outstanding Lead Actor" - Enter Laughing:The Musical 2009 Outer Critics Circle Award for "Outstanding Actor in a Musical" - Enter Laughing:The Musical 2009 Drama League Award for "Distinguished Performance" - Enter Laughing : The Musical 2009 Drama Desk Award for "Outstanding Actor in a Musical" - Enter Laughing: The Musical 2006 Carbonell Award for "Best Actor in a Musical" - Where's Charley?''

References

External links 

 
 Josh Grisetti at Internet Off-Broadway Database
  of Josh Grisetti

1981 births
American male stage actors
American male film actors
American male television actors
Living people
Theatre World Award winners